Samuel Isaac (1812 – 22 November 1886) was a merchant and a projector of the Mersey Railway Tunnel.

Early life
Isaac, son of Lewis Isaac of Poole, Dorsetshire, by Catherine, daughter of N. Solomon of Margate, was born at Chatham, Kent in 1815. Coming to London as a young man, he established a large business as an army contractor in Jermyn Street, trading as Isaac, Campbell, & Company. His brother, Saul Isaac, J. P., afterwards member for Nottingham 1874–80, was associated with him in partnership.

Confederate war
The firm during the Confederate war in America were the largest European supporters of the southern states. Their ships, outward bound with military stores and freighted home with cotton, were the most enterprising of blockade-runners between 1861 and 1865. Isaac's eldest son Henry, who died at Nassau, West Indies, during the war, had much to do with this branch of the business. Having raised a regiment of volunteers from among the workmen of his own factory at Northampton, Isaac was rewarded with the military rank of major. He and his firm were large holders of Confederate funds, and were consequently ruined on the conclusion of the American war in 1865.

Mersey railway tunnel
In 1880 he acquired the rights of the promoters of the Mersey Railway Tunnel, and himself undertook the making of the tunnel, letting the works to Messrs. Waddell, and employing as engineers Mr. James Brunlees and Sir Douglas Fox. The Right Hon. H. C. Raikes became chairman, with the Right Hon. E. P. Bouverie as vice-chairman, of the company formed to carry through the undertaking. Money was raised, and the boring was completed under Isaac's superintendence on 17 January 1884. The tunnel was opened on 13 February 1885; the first passenger train ran through on 22 December; it was formally opened by King Edward VII when Prince of Wales, 20 January 1886. Queen Victoria accepted from Isaac a jewelled representation of the tunnel, in which the speck of light at the end of the excavation was represented by a brilliant. He formed a collection of paintings containing some of the best works of Mr. B. W. Leader, A.R.A.

Isaac died at 29 Warrington Crescent, Maida Vale, London, leaving £203,084 17s. 9d.

References

Attribution

1812 births
1886 deaths
English Jews
People from Poole
19th-century English businesspeople
Jewish Confederates